Hongkong United Dockyards abbreviated to United Dockyards or HUD  is a dockyard built on the site of the former Shek Wan or "Stone Bay", on Tsing Yi Island of Hong Kong.

History
HUD was formed in 1973 from the merger of the Hong Kong and Whampoa Dock (1863) and the Taikoo Dockyard (1902 or 1905). It is jointly owned by CK Hutchison and Swire. The HUD facilities in Tsing Yi replaced the Whampoa Dockyard in Hung Hom, which became the Whampoa Garden estate, and the Taikoo Dockyard in Quarry Bay, which became the Taikoo Shing estate.

Operations 
HUD's main business is:
 Salvage and towage
 Ship repairs
 Land-based engineering projects

The company employs over 400 people including subcontractors to perform repairs.

The named United was added when it was acquired in 1995.

Facilities 

Instead of a fixed dockyard, it uses a 40,000t floating dockyard to perform repairs in Tsing Yi. There are two berths for ships being repaired but not requiring to be placed in the floating dock.

The dockyard has four Ramparts 3000 ASD tugs used to tow ships into the facility.

Boats constructed
Most ships built here are for local use:
 Sea Lion class command boats 1965 – two for the Hong Kong Police Marine Region (retired 1993)
 Sea Rover class command boats 1955–56 – six for the Hong Kong Police Marine Region

Transportation 
The dockyard is accessible via:
 Green minibus 88M:  Hong Kong United Dockyard <-> Kwai Fong station
The dockyard is also accessed by Routes 3 and 8 via Sai Tso Wan Road.

References 

United Dockyard
United Dockyard, Hong Kong
United Dockyard
United Dockyard
United Dockyard
Ships built in Hong Kong
1863 establishments in Hong Kong